Erik Overbye (born 6 December 1934) is a Danish film producer. He produced 15 films between 1961 and 1981. He also directed the 1961 Danish film Komtessen. He was born in Copenhagen, Denmark.

Filmography
 Landsbylægen (1961)
 Det tossede paradis (1962)
 Oskar (1962)
 Drømmen om det hvide slot (1962)
 Vi har det jo dejligt (1963)
 Frøken April (1963)
 Bussen (1963)
 Selvmordsskolen (1964)
 Slottet (1964)
 Prinsessen rejser (1967)
 Mig og mafiaen (1973)
 Mafiaen - det er osse mig! (1974)
 Sådan er jeg osse (1980)
 Danmark er lukket (1980)
 Langturschauffør (1981)

References

External links

1934 births
Living people
Danish film producers
People from Copenhagen